A Moslem (Musulmanin) is a 1995 Russian drama film directed by Vladimir Khotinenko. The film was selected as the Russian entry for the Best Foreign Language Film at the 68th Academy Awards, but was not accepted as a nominee.

Cast
 Yevgeny Mironov as Kolya Ivanov the Mussulman
 Aleksandr Baluev as Fedya, Kolya's brother
 Nina Usatova as Sonya, Kolya's mother
 Evdokiya Germanova as Verka
 Alexander Peskov as Unknown (political officer in the military unit, where Kolya served)
 Ivan Bortnik as Kolya's godfather
 Sergey Taramaev as Holy Father Mikhail
 Pyotr Zaychenko as Pavel Petrovich
 Vladimir Ilyin as Gena the shepherd

Awards
 Award of Montreal World Film Festival: Special Grand Prix of the jury - "Best film of the year" (1995)
 Awards of Kinotavr: "Best Actress", "Best Actor" (1995)
 Nika Award: "Best Screenplay", "Best Actor in a Supporting Role" (1996)
 Awards of International Festival of Orthodox film "Golden Knight": "Best Director", "Best Screenplay", "Best Actress" (1995)
 Awards of Russia cinema press: "Best film", "Best Actor" (1995)

See also
 List of submissions to the 68th Academy Awards for Best Foreign Language Film
 List of Russian submissions for the Academy Award for Best Foreign Language Film

References

External links
 

1995 films
1995 drama films
Russian drama films
1990s Russian-language films
Films about Islam
Films directed by Vladimir Khotinenko